Magoun may refer to:

Surname
Francis Peabody Magoun MC (1895–1979), scholar of medieval and English literature in the 20th century
George C. Magoun (1840–1893), Chairman of the Board of the Atchison, Topeka and Santa Fe Railway
George Frederick Magoun (1821–1896), Congregationalist minister, the first president of Iowa College
Horace Winchell Magoun (1907–1991), American neuroscientist and neuroendocrinologist

Ships
Thatcher Magoun (clipper), extreme clipper launched in 1855, named after Medford's shipbuilder Thatcher Magoun

Geography
Adams-Magoun House, historic house at 483 Broadway in Somerville, Massachusetts
Magoun Square, neighborhood on the border of Medford and Somerville, Massachusetts

See also
Maghound
Magou
Mangouin